Dovydas Nemeravičius (born 11 December 1996) is a Lithuanian rower.

In 2016 European championships he won silver with Lithuanian quadruple sculls team. He was also selected to the national team to represent Lithuania in 2016 Summer Olympics.

References

Lithuanian male rowers
1996 births
Living people
Rowers at the 2016 Summer Olympics
Rowers at the 2020 Summer Olympics
Olympic rowers of Lithuania
World Rowing Championships medalists for Lithuania